Grace Park (born March 14, 1974) is an American-Canadian actress and model, known for her roles in the science-fiction series Battlestar Galactica, as Shannon Ng in the Canadian teen soap opera series Edgemont, as Officer Kono Kalakaua in the police procedural Hawaii Five-0, and as Katherine Kim in A Million Little Things.

Early life
Born in Los Angeles, Park moved with her family to Canada when she was 22 months old. She was raised in the Vancouver neighbourhood of Kerrisdale. Park was born to Korean parents. She graduated from Magee Secondary School in 1992 and holds a degree in psychology from the University of British Columbia.

Career

At age 25, Park was cast as high school student Shannon Ng on the Canadian teen soap opera Edgemont. She appeared in the miniseries Battlestar Galactica in 2003 and continued as the same or related characters in subsequent series and films.

Park had a role in the 2007 movie West 32nd, a crime drama set in New York City's Korean neighborhood. She appeared as Lt. Sandra Telfair in Electronic Arts' Command & Conquer 3: Tiberium Wars, along with her Battlestar Galactica co-star, Tricia Helfer.

In 2008, she had co-starring roles in the A&E series The Cleaner until it was cancelled on September 25, 2009 and the CBC series The Border until it was cancelled in 2010. In 2009, Park had a cameo role (uncredited) on the ninth season, twentieth episode of television show CSI: Crime Scene Investigation entitled "A Space Oddity". She appeared as a fan in a crowd at a science fiction convention, objecting to a gritty remake of a Star Trek–like series, comparable to the Battlestar Galactica remake in which she starred. In 2009 she reprised her role from Battlestar Galactica in the television movie Battlestar Galactica: The Plan.

In 2010, she appeared in the Fox series Human Target as Eva Kahn, and was a main character, Kono Kalakaua, in the 2010 CBS revival of Hawaii Five-0. Park and fellow Hawaii Five-0 co-star Daniel Dae Kim left the show in 2017, leaving the cast without any Asian regulars, after a salary dispute where it was reported that CBS's latest offer paid them 10–15% less than their white co-stars, Alex O'Loughlin and Scott Caan. CBS claimed that they had given "unprecedented" salary raises to Park and Kim, suggesting that they had been paid a lot less under their old contracts. Some critics noted that the network's "refusal to pay Kim and Park on matching terms with O'Loughlin and Caan was CBS's formal declaration that they were determined to protect a disparity that has been a sore point since the show's premiere: The assertion was that O'Loughlin and Caan are Hawaii Five-0 "stars" with Kim and Park being merely "co-leads" or supporting cast", yet Kim and Park were originally featured heavily on advertising and proved to be a crucial part of the show's success.

Personal life 
In 2004, Park married real estate developer Phil Kim. The two live in Vancouver. They have one son, born in 2013.

Park is a former member of NXIVM, a multi-level marketing organization and cult, and appeared in video interviews with NXIVM founder Keith Raniere.

Filmography

Film

Television

References

External links 

 
 
 Grace Park's profile on The Korea Society's Film Journal
 Grace Park's biography on filmbug
 Grace Park interview on The Scifi World About season 3 & 4 of Galactica
 Grace Park on Battlestar Wiki

1974 births
21st-century American actresses
21st-century Canadian actresses
Actresses from Los Angeles
Actresses from Vancouver
American emigrants to Canada
American film actresses
American people of Canadian descent
American television actresses
American actresses of Korean descent
Canadian actresses of Korean descent
Canadian film actresses
Canadian television actresses
Living people
Naturalized citizens of Canada
NXIVM people
University of British Columbia alumni